The Tunasan River, also referred to as the Tunasan-Cuyab River, is a river system in the Philippines. This river begins in Dasmariñas, Cavite, and ends  at the border of Muntinlupa, and San Pedro, Laguna. It is one of 21 major tributaries of Laguna de Bay.

The river system has six adjoining creeks:
 There are two in San Pedro, Laguna and Dasmariñas, Cavite
 Three creeks joins the system from the ponds of The Filipinas Golf Club, and
 The last one connects from the drainage system of RMT Complex.

Both the river and barangay Tunasan got their names from a medicinal plant locally called tunas (Nymphaea nouchali) which was abundant on the Tunasan River and the shoreline of Laguna de Bay.

The Tunasan River received media attention in 1994 and 1995 due to a series of "fish kills" caused by the high Biochemical Oxygen Demand from decomposing water lilies, and by the profusion of residential wastes that find their way into the river during the rainy season.

See also

 Laguna Lake Development Authority
 List of rivers and esteros in Manila

References

Rivers of Metro Manila
Rivers of the Philippines
Tributaries of Laguna de Bay
Landforms of Laguna (province)